James Devlin (born 7 May 1989), better known mononymously as Devlin, is an English rapper and songwriter from Dagenham, London. He attended the Brittons Academy in Rainham, East London. He was signed to Island Records from 2010 to 2015. He is part of grime collective 'O.T Crew' with Dogzilla, Deeperman, M. Eye, Benson, Kozy, Syer Bars, Shotz, Meshie, Props and Daze. Devlin was also a member of the Movement, consisting of himself, Wretch 32, Scorcher, Ghetts, Lightning, Mercston and DJ Unique but has since left.

Early life
Devlin was born on 7 May 1989 in Bermondsey and grew up on a housing estate in Dagenham. His mother was a council worker while his father was a forklift driver. Devlin released his second solo mixtape The Art of Rolling in 2008.

Career

2010–11: Bud, Sweat and Beers
Devlin's debut album, Bud, Sweat and Beers was released on Island Records in 2010. The first single from the album was "Brainwashed", which was released on 8 August 2010 in the UK and debuted on the UK Singles Chart at number 31, and number 11 on the UK R&B Chart. The second single, "Runaway", was released on 24 October 2010, where it debuted at number 15, marking Devlin's most successful single to date. The single was succeeded by the release of the debut album, Bud, Sweat and Beers, which was released on 1 November 2010 and debuted at number 21 on the UK Albums Chart. "London City" entered the UK chart at number 181 following strong digital downloads from the album. The third single released from the album was "Let It Go" featuring British producer Labrinth. The track, which was released on 31 January 2011, charted at number 59 in the UK based on downloads alone.

2011–13: A Moving Picture
His second studio album, A Moving Picture, was released on 4 February 2013. It peaked at number 19 on the UK Albums Chart.

Personal life
He is a supporter of Tottenham Hotspur. Devlin is of Irish descent.

Diagnosed at the age of 14, Devlin has Type 1 Diabetes.

Discography

Studio albums
 Bud, Sweat and Beers (2010)
 A Moving Picture (2013)
 The Devil In (2017)
 The Outcast (2019)
 Eyes for the Blind (2022)

References

External links
Devlin Official website
Devlin News & Lyrics
Delvin Photos

Rappers from London
Grime music artists
English songwriters
English male rappers
Living people
1989 births
People from Dagenham
Island Records artists
English people of Irish descent
British male songwriters